Çukurova motorway is the unofficial name of the  motorway of Çukurova (ancient Cilicia) in Turkey.

The list of junctions 

Connections 

The main junctions of the motorway are as follows;

At junction K2; (east of Tarsus), it merges to another motorway;  to north .
At junction K9; (Çeşmeli) it is connected  to  highway (Datça Mersin highway) to west. 
At junction K3; (Çamtepe) it is connected to  highway to north. 

References 

Çukurova
Motorways in Turkey
Mediterranean Region, Turkey